Chasing the Sun is the seventh album by American blues rock band Indigenous.   It was released on June 13, 2006 on the Vanguard label.  It went to #2 on the Billboard Top Blues Albums chart.

Track list 
"Runaway"		4:30
"I'll Be Waiting"	4:18
"Number Nine Train"	4:20
"Come on Home"		4:28
"Fool Me Again"	4:15
"Feel Alright Now"	3:26
"The Way You Shake"	3:28
"Out of Nowhere"       3:18
"Leaving"		6:07
"Born in Time"		3:51

References

Indigenous (band) albums
2006 albums